Berne University may refer to:
University of Berne, Switzerland
Berne University, Pennsylvania, Virginia, St. Kitts an unaccredited institution of higher education